Thomas Adams (1730 – August 1788) was a politician and businessman from Virginia. One of the Founding Fathers of the United States, he was a delegate of the Continental Congress and signed the Articles of Confederation.

Early years
Adams was born in New Kent County, Virginia, about 1730, son of Ebenezer Adams and Tabitha Cocke. His father was a native of London, England, who settled in Virginia previous to 1714 and received grants in Henrico and New Kent counties. Adams attended there the common schools.

Career
His first political position was as a clerk of Henrico County and vestryman of that parish, from 1757 to 1761, and later a member of the Virginia House of Burgesses, and church warden until 1762. Adams had extensive business interests in England and resided there from 1762 to around 1774.

In 1774, he resumed his residence in Virginia before the outbreak of the American Revolution. He became chairman of the New Kent County Committee of Safety and signed the Virginia Association entered into by the House of Burgesses, on May 27, 1774. Adams was chosen as a delegate from Virginia to the Continental Congress in 1778 and 1779, and signed the Articles of Confederation.

Later years
In 1780, Adams moved to Augusta County, Virginia, where he was elected to the Virginia State Senate in the 9th, 10th and 11th legislatures, from 1784 to 1787. He married Elizabeth (Fauntleroy) Cocke, widow of his cousin, Bowler Cocke. Adams died on his estate, "Cowpasture", in Augusta County, in August 1788. Some other sources report that he died in October 1788.

References

Sources
 
Attribution
 

Founding Fathers of the United States
House of Burgesses members
Signers of the Articles of Confederation
Continental Congressmen from Virginia
American people of English descent
18th-century American politicians
1730 births
1788 deaths